Considered harmful is a part of a phrasal template "X considered harmful". , its snowclones have been used in the titles of at least 65 critical essays in computer science and related disciplines.
Its use in this context originated with a 1968 letter by Edsger Dijkstra published as "Go To Statement Considered Harmful".

History
Considered harmful was already a journalistic cliché used in headlines, well before the Dijkstra article, as in, for example, the headline over a letter published in 1949 in The New York Times: "Rent Control Controversy / Enacting Now of Hasty Legislation Considered Harmful".

Considered harmful was popularized among computer scientists by Edsger Dijkstra's letter "Go To Statement Considered Harmful",
published in the March 1968 Communications of the ACM (CACM), in which he criticized the excessive use of the GOTO statement in programming languages of the day and advocated structured programming instead. The original title of the letter, as submitted to CACM, was "A Case Against the Goto Statement", but CACM editor Niklaus Wirth changed the title to "Goto Statement Considered Harmful". Regarding this new title, Donald Knuth quipped that "Dr. Goto cheerfully complained that he was always being eliminated."

Frank Rubin published a criticism of Dijkstra's letter in the March 1987 CACM where it appeared under the title "'GOTO Considered Harmful' Considered Harmful".  The May 1987 CACM printed further replies, both for and against, under the title "'"GOTO Considered Harmful" Considered Harmful' Considered Harmful?". Dijkstra's own response to this controversy was titled On a Somewhat Disappointing Correspondence.

Snowclones 
 
  (Full proposal text was included in post-meeting distribution; see summary.)
 
 
 
 
  See C shell.
 
 
 
 
 
 
 
 
 
 
Cory J. Kapser and Michael W. Godfrey (October 2006), "'Cloning Considered Harmful' Considered Harmful". doi:10.1109/WCRE.2006.1
  See C (programming language).

References

History of computing
Snowclones
Edsger W. Dijkstra
Computer humor